Alan Lowndes (birth unknown) is a former rugby union and professional rugby league footballer who played in the 1960s and 1970s.

Playing career

County honours
Alan Lowndes won a cap for Yorkshire (RL) while at Castleford; he played , i.e. number 2, in the 42–3 victory over Cumberland at Hull Kingston Rovers' stadium on 1 October 1969.

Challenge Cup Final appearances
Alan Lowndes played , i.e. number 5, in Castleford's 11–6 victory over Salford in the 1969 Challenge Cup Final during the 1968–69 season at Wembley Stadium, London on Saturday 17 May 1969, in front of a crowd of 97,939, and played  in the 7–2 victory over Wigan in the 1970 Challenge Cup Final during the 1969–70 season at Wembley Stadium, London on Saturday 9 May 1970, in front of a crowd of 95,255.

County Cup Final appearances
Alan Lowndes played , i.e. number 5, in Castleford's 7–11 defeat by Hull Kingston Rovers in the 1971 Yorkshire County Cup Final during the 1971–72 season at Belle Vue, Wakefield on Saturday 21 August 1971.

References

External links

Search for "Lowndes" at rugbyleagueproject.org
(archived by web.archive.org) Profile at thecastlefordtigers.co.uk

Living people
Castleford Tigers players
English rugby league players
English rugby union players
Place of birth missing (living people)
Rugby league wingers
Rugby union wings
Wakefield RFC players
Year of birth missing (living people)
Yorkshire County RFU players
Yorkshire rugby league team players